Islam in Northern Ireland details Islam in Northern Ireland since its creation as a separate country within the United Kingdom on 3 May 1921, under the Government of Ireland Act 1920.

Though a small number of Muslims already lived in what became Northern Ireland in 1921, the bulk of Muslims in Northern Ireland today come from families who immigrated during the late 20th century.  At the time of the 2001 Census there were 1,943 living in Northern Ireland, though The 2021 census recorded 12,000 Muslims in Northern Ireland, although numbers are likely to be higher. The Muslims in Northern Ireland come from over 40 countries of origin, from Western Europe all the way through to the Far East. 

The Belfast Islamic Centre was established in 1978 by a group of Muslims from the local community. The centre is located near Queens University in south Belfast. Today, the centre acts not only as a place of worship, but as a community centre, social-cultural centre, resource centre, advice centre and a day centre.

According to The Economist, "Many of the 4,000 or so Muslims...are doctors, academics, entrepreneurs and property developers. Only in the past few years have they been joined by a poorer group of asylum-seekers from Somalia. They tend to inhabit leafy, cosmopolitan districts in south Belfast, near Queen’s University where many have taught or studied."

Islamic Centres and Mosques in Northern Ireland
As of December 2019, there are a total of ten Islamic centres or prayer places in Northern Ireland. Almost half of these are located in or near Belfast. These Islamic centres are: Belfast Islamic Centre (BIC), Belfast; Northern Ireland Muslim Family Association (NIMFA), Belfast;  Dunmurry Masjid, Belfast; Newtownards Mosque, Newtownards; Muslim Association of Coleraine, Coleraine; North West Islamic Association, Derry; Muslim Association of Craigavon, Craigavon; Aman Association, Fermanagh; Muslim Association of Newry, Newry; and Dungannon Muslim community centre, Dungannon.

These centres organise social and religious events for the Muslim communities in their respective areas.

See also
 Islam
 Islam in England
 Islam in Ireland
 Islam in Scotland
 Islam in Wales
 Muslim Council of Britain
 Islam in the United Kingdom
 Islam in the Republic of Ireland
 Religion in Northern Ireland
 The Muslim Weekly
 British Muslims
 Islam in London

References

External links
Map of Islamic Centres in Northern Ireland
Belfast Islamic Centre
North West Islamic Association
Northern Ireland Muslim Family Association (NIMFA)
Islamic Cultural Centre of Ireland
Ahlul Bayt Islamic Centre of Ireland
Dublin City University Islamic Society
The Muslim Survival Guide for Northern Ireland and the Republic of Ireland

Cork Muslim Women's Group